John Scrymgeour or Scrimgeour, 1st Viscount of Dudhope (died 7 March 1642 or 1643) was a Scottish politician.

He succeeded his father James Scrimgeour as hereditary Constable of Dundee and Standard Bearer of Scotland in 1612. He represented Forfarshire in Parliament in 1612, 1617 and 1621, and Argyllshire from 1628 to 1633. On 15 November 1641 he was created Viscount of Dudhope and Lord Scrymgeour, with remainder to his heirs male whatsoever.

Marriage and children
He married Margaret Seton, a daughter of David Seton of Parbroath. Their children included:
 James Scrymgeour, who succeeded in his titles
 Magdalen Scrymgeour who married Alexnder Irvine of Drum
 Mary Scrymgeour, who married Peter Hay of Megginch

Margaret Seton, Lady Dudhope, was a friend of Jean Drummond, Countess of Roxburghe, whose step-daughter Isobel Ker was married to their son, James Scrimgeour, later 2nd Viscount Dudhope. The Countess of Roxburghe visited them at Dudhope Castle in 1619. John Scrimgeour ordered a pair of pistols as a gift for her husband Lord Roxburghe from a gunsmith in Dundee.

References

Externanal links

 Dudhope, Viscount of (S, 1641)
 The complete peerage of England, Scotland, Ireland, Great Britain and the United Kingdom, extant, extinct, or dormant

1640s deaths
Shire Commissioners to the Parliament of Scotland
Viscounts in the Peerage of Scotland
Politics of Angus, Scotland
Politics of Argyll and Bute
Year of birth unknown
Peers of Scotland created by Charles I
Members of the Parliament of Scotland 1612
Members of the Parliament of Scotland 1617
Members of the Parliament of Scotland 1621
Members of the Parliament of Scotland 1628–1633
Members of the Convention of the Estates of Scotland 1643–44